John G. Frayne (July 8, 1894 in Ireland – October 31, 1990 in Pasadena, California) was a physicist and sound engineer.

Career
Frayne received his Ph.D. in physics from the University of Minnesota while working at the Bell Laboratories. In 1928, he went to California Institute of Technology as a National Research Fellow in Physics.

In 1949, with Halley Wolfe, he wrote the classic textbook Elements of Sound Recording.

Among his technical achievements were the development of sound recording techniques and their reproduction 
for optical sound recording systems, which led to stereo-optical formats used by films in the 1970s and '80s. He was a 
co-inventor of the sphere densitometer, which won a Scientific or Technical Academy Award in 1941. He was also the co-inventor of the stereo disc cutter which was standard in the recording industry, and the co-inventor of the inter-modulation techniques of distortion measurements, which won him an Academy Award in 1953.

He was awarded a Gordon E. Sawyer Award (Oscar statuette) by the Academy of Motion Picture Arts and Sciences in 1983.

Awards
Dr. Frayne, a Fellow of the Audio Engineering Society (AES), received its Gold Medal Award for Outstanding Achievement in advancing the art of audio engineering in 1976. He received the SMPTE Progress Medal in 1947.

External links
An Afternoon with John G. Frayne
In Memoriam, AES Journal

1894 births
1990 deaths
University of Minnesota College of Science and Engineering alumni
People educated at Kilkenny College
Recipients of the John A. Bonner Medal of Commendation
American audio engineers
20th-century American engineers
Academy Award for Technical Achievement winners
Irish emigrants to the United States (before 1923)
Fellows of the American Physical Society